In mathematics, also written , , or simply , is a divergent series, meaning that its sequence of partial sums does not converge to a limit in the real numbers. The sequence 1 can be thought of as a geometric series with the common ratio 1. Unlike other geometric series with rational ratio (except −1), it converges in neither the real numbers nor in the -adic numbers for some . In the context of the extended real number line
 
since its sequence of partial sums increases monotonically without bound.

The two formulas given above are not valid at zero however, but the analytic continuation is.

Using this one gets (given that ),

where the power series expansion for  about  follows because  has a simple pole of residue one there. In this sense .

Emilio Elizalde presents a comment from others about the series:

See also
 Grandi's series
 1 − 2 + 3 − 4 + · · ·
 1 + 2 + 3 + 4 + · · ·
 1 + 2 + 4 + 8 + · · ·
 1 − 2 + 4 − 8 + ⋯
 1 − 1 + 2 − 6 + 24 − 120 + · · ·
 Harmonic series

Notes

External links

Arithmetic series
Divergent series
Geometric series
1 (number)
Mathematical paradoxes